Sailor (1817–1820) was a British Thoroughbred racehorse. In a brief racing career in the spring and summer of 1820 he won both of his races including The Derby. He collapsed and died on the Newmarket gallops shortly after his Derby win.

Background
Sailor was a tall, leggy chestnut horse sired by Scud out of the mare Goosander. Goosander was a highly successful broodmare who also produced The Oaks winner Shoveler and was a sister to the dam of the Derby winner Sam. Sailor was trained by William Chifney and ridden in the Derby by Chifney’s younger brother, Sam Chifney, Jr. Chifney was one of the outstanding jockeys of his era, and one of the first to hold horses up in the early stages of a race before finishing strongly: he became famous for this tactic which became known as the "Chifney Rush".

Racing career
Sailor was one of the leading fancies for the 1820 Derby before he appeared on a racecourse: in November 1819 he was being offered at odds of 15/1 for the race by British bookmakers. Sailor won a sweepstakes at Newmarket on his debut in spring 1820. The Derby was run in extremely difficult conditions at Epsom on Sailor's birthday on 18 May. A violent storm on the eve of the race demolished many of the tents and booths which had been set up on the downs and left the ground very soft, which suited Sailor.  He started the second favourite at odds of 4/1 in a field of fifteen runners. In a fast-run race, Sailor won the Derby easily by two lengths from Abjer, with the favourite Pindarrie finishing fifth.

In the autumn of 1820, Sailor was being exercised on Newmarket Heath when he stumbled, staggered for two hundred yards and collapsed. He died on the spot from what was subsequently determined to be a burst blood vessel in his chest.

Pedigree

Sailor's pedigree contained significant inbreeding. He was inbred 3 × 3 to King Fergus, meaning that the stallion appeared twice in the third generation of his pedigree. He was also inbred 4 × 4 × 4 to Eclipse, 3 × 4 to Highflyer, and 4 × 4 to Herod.

References

1817 racehorse births
1820 racehorse deaths
Epsom Derby winners
Racehorses trained in the United Kingdom
Undefeated racehorses
Thoroughbred family 6-c